Irving Langmuir (1881–1957), American chemist and physicist who made significant contributions to several widely varied areas of modern science, is the eponym of the topics listed below.

Science
 Child–Langmuir law
 Hill–Langmuir equation
 Langmuir adsorption model
 Langmuir–Blodgett film
 Langmuir wave
 Langmuir–Blodgett trough
 Langmuir's examples
 Langmuir–Hinshelwood kinetics
 Langmuir isotherm
 Langmuir lattice
 Langmuir–McLean theory
 Langmuir monolayer
 Langmuir probe
Dual segmented Langmuir probe
 Langmuir–Taylor detector
 Langmuir torch
 Langmuir turbulence
 Langmuir circulation
 Langmuir equation
 Langmuir wave
 Langmuir states
 Lewis–Langmuir theory
 Knudsen-Langmuir equation
 Saha–Langmuir equation

Other
 Irving Langmuir House
 Langmuir (journal)
 Langmuir (crater)
 Langmuir (unit)
 Langmuir Laboratory for Atmospheric Research
 Irving Langmuir Award
 Langmuir Cove
 Langmuir Hall, Stony Brook University

Langmuir